Yamhill is a city in Yamhill County, Oregon, United States. Located in the northern part of the county, it is situated at the intersection of Oregon Route 47 and Oregon Route 240. The population was 1,147 at the 2020 census. Originally named North Yamhill, it was incorporated under that name by the Oregon Legislative Assembly on February 20, 1891.

Geography

Climate
This region experiences warm (but not hot) and dry summers, with no average monthly temperatures above . According to the Köppen Climate Classification system, Yamhill has a warm-summer Mediterranean climate, abbreviated "Csb" on climate maps.

Demographics

2010 census
As of the census of 2010, there were 1,024 people, 353 households, and 285 families residing in the city. The racial makeup of the city was 91.2% White, 0.1% African American, 1.3% Native American, 1.1% Asian, 2.6% from other races, and 3.7% from two or more races. Hispanic or Latino of any race were 5.5% of the population.

There were 353 households, of which 42.8% had children under the age of 18 living with them, 63.5% were married couples living together, 11.6% had a female householder with no husband present, 5.7% had a male householder with no wife present, and 19.3% were non-families. 13.3% of all households were made up of individuals, and 4.8% had someone living alone who was 65 years of age or older. The average household size was 2.88 and the average family size was 3.13.

The median age in the city was 37.6 years. 27.7% of residents were under the age of 18; 6.8% were between the ages of 18 and 24; 25.6% were from 25 to 44; 31% were from 45 to 64; and 8.9% were 65 years of age or older. The gender makeup of the city was 49.4% male and 50.6% female.

2000 census
As of the census of 2000, there were 794 people, 256 households, and 207 families residing in the city. The population density was 1,974.3 people per square mile (766.4/km). There were 267 housing units at an average density of 663.9 per square mile (257.7/km). The racial makeup of the city was 96.47% White, 0.25% Native American, 1.39% Asian, 0.38% from other races, and 1.51% from two or more races. Hispanic or Latino of any race were 4.79% of the population.

There were 256 households, out of which 46.5% had children under the age of 18 living with them, 65.6% were married couples living together, 10.5% had a female householder with no husband present, and 19.1% were non-families. 16.4% of all households were made up of individuals, and 7.8% had someone living alone who was 65 years of age or older. The average household size was 3.10 and the average family size was 3.43.

In the city, the population was spread out, with 31.7% under the age of 18, 10.7% from 18 to 24, 27.6% from 25 to 44, 22.8% from 45 to 64, and 7.2% who were 65 years of age or older. The median age was 32 years. For every 100 females, there were 98.0 males. For every 100 females age 18 and over, there were 96.4 males.

The median income for a household in the city was $49,688, and the median income for a family was $52,344. Males had a median income of $38,661 versus $24,583 for females. The per capita income for the city was $16,745. About 5.3% of families and 5.1% of the population were below the poverty line, including 6.9% of those under age 18 and none of those age 65 or over.

Education
The Yamhill Carlton School District is headquartered in Yamhill. Students attend Yamhill Carlton Elementary School (YCES) in Carlton, Yamhill Carlton Intermediate School (YCIS), or Yamhill Carlton High School (YCHS), both located in Yamhill.

Notable people

Beverly Cleary, children's author; her first memoir was called A Girl from Yamhill
Thurston Daniels, third Lieutenant Governor of Washington
Nicholas Kristof, former columnist for The New York Times, grew up on a sheep and cherry farm in Yamhill
Elette Boyle, computer scientist and cryptographer, a professor of computer science at the Interdisciplinary Center Herzliya

Architecture
The John Marion Bunn House and Lee Laughlin House are both listed on the National Register of Historic Places.

References

External links

 Entry for Yamhill in the Oregon Blue Book

Cities in Oregon
Cities in Yamhill County, Oregon
Portland metropolitan area
Willamette Valley
1891 establishments in Oregon
Populated places established in 1891